The ninth cycle of Australia's Next Top Model began airing 30 April 2015 on Fox8. Jennifer Hawkins and Alex Perry returned judges for this season, while Cheyenne Tozzi was added as a new co-mentor alongside Didier Cohen, who was formerly a judge on the previous season.

The prizes for this cycle included a one-year modelling contract with IMG Sydney, a trip to New York City for New York Fashion Week valued at 20,000 thanks to TRESemmé, a brand new Mazda 2 Genki, and an editorial spread in Elle Australia.

The winner of the competition was 20 year-old Brittany Beattie from Whittlesea, Victoria.

Series summary
This series saw 12 new contestants with a thirteenth cast member added in as a wildcard contestant. In contrast to the former two cycles there was no casting episode this season. A new scoring system was implemented on the show, with models receiving a score on both the challenges and shoots to determine who would go home. This system replaced the show's previous elimination format, where the name of each contestant was called in order of merit.

Requirements
All applying contestants were required to be aged 16 to 21 in order to apply for the show. To qualify, all applicants had to be an Australian citizen currently living in Australia. Additional requirements stated that a contestant could not have had previous experience as a model in a national campaign within the last five years, and if a contestant was represented by an agent or a manager, she had to terminate that representation prior to the competition.

Auditions
Auditions were held once in Newcastle, Gold Coast, Adelaide and Perth. They were held in two different venues in Sydney and Melbourne.

In addition to the audition tour, an online selfie competition dubbed 'Australia's Next Top Selfie' was held for models who were unable to show up for the auditions. Applicants were required to submit a photograph tagged #antmselfie on Instagram, Twitter or Facebook. All live audition requirements still applied. The winner of the competition, later revealed on the show to be 18 year-old Zahra Thalari from Sydney, was granted a spot within the final cast.

Guest judges
Instead of finding a replacement for the late Charlotte Dawson the show opted to include a special guest judge each week. Foxtel Executive Director of Television Brian Walsh explained: "The whole team on the show has been deeply affected by the loss of Charlotte earlier this year. We feel the series will never be the same without her and in 2015 we will welcome a special guest judge each week to join the judging panel as in our minds Charlotte is irreplaceable." The guest judges for this year included Alessandra Ambrosio, Alexandra Agoston, Alyssa Sutherland, Coco Rocha, Elyse Taylor, Jean Paul Gaultier, Kelly Osbourne, Kim Kardashian, Linda Evangelista, Megan Gale, and Tyra Banks.

Cast

Contestants
(Ages stated are at start of contest)

Judges
Jennifer Hawkins (host)
Alex Perry

Other cast members
Cheyenne Tozzi - mentor
Didier Cohen - mentor

Episodes

Results 

 The contestant was eliminated
 The contestant was tied at the bottom two with the lowest score, but was not eliminated
 The contestant won the competition.

Bottom two/three

 The contestant was eliminated after her first time in the bottom two/three
 The contestant was eliminated after her second time in the bottom two/three
 The contestant was eliminated in the semi-final judging and placed fourth
 The contestant was eliminated in the semi-final judging and placed third
 The contestant was eliminated in the final judging and placed as the runner-up

Results 

 The contestant had the highest total score
 The contestant had the highest total score and won the competition
 The contestant had the second lowest score
 The contestant was tied for the lowest score and was saved
 The contestant had the lowest total score and was eliminated

Average call-out order
Final two is not included.

Viewership

Notes

References

External links
 Official website (archive at the Wayback Machine)

Australia's Next Top Model seasons
2015 Australian television seasons
Television shows filmed in Australia
Television shows filmed in New York City